In graph theory, a branch of mathematics, the simplex graph  of an undirected graph  is itself a graph, with one node for each clique (a set of mutually adjacent vertices) in .

The empty set is included as one of the cliques of  that are used to form the clique graph, as is every set of one vertex and every set of two adjacent vertices. Therefore, the simplex graph contains within it a subdivision of  itself. The simplex graph of a complete graph is a hypercube graph, and the simplex graph of a cycle graph of length four or more is a gear graph. The simplex graph of the complement graph of a path graph is a Fibonacci cube.

The simplex graph is the median graph corresponding to this median algebra structure. When  is the complement graph of a bipartite graph, the cliques of  can be given a stronger structure as a distributive lattice, and in this case the simplex graph is the graph of the lattice. As is true for median graphs more generally, every simplex graph is itself bipartite.

As a consequence of the existence of triangle-free graphs with high chromatic number, they showed that there exist two-dimensional topological median algebras that cannot be embedded into products of finitely many real trees.  also use simplex graphs as part of their proof that testing whether a graph is triangle-free or whether it is a median graph may be performed equally quickly.

Notes

References
.
.
.
.
.

Graph operations
Graph families
Bipartite graphs